Clair Evelyn Houssemayne du Boulay  is a retired British professor and expert in pathology and medical education. She was the Vice-President of the Royal College of Pathologists from 2002 to 2005.

Career

Professor du Boulay practised as a consultant pathologist specialising in gastrointestinal pathology and soft tissue sarcomas at the University of Southampton.

Following her clinical work she became involved in medical education and was appointed Postgraduate Dean at the Wessex Deanery, where she managed the training and education of healthcare professionals in more than fifty NHS Trusts across the south of England.

She was Vice-President of the Royal College of Pathologists from 2002 to 2005.

Awards and honours
She was a fellow of the Royal College of Pathologists.

She was awarded an Officer of the Order of the British Empire in the 2008 New Year Honours for services to medicine.

Publications

Professor du Boulay is the author and co-author of multiple peer-reviewed journal articles and books including:
 Revalidation for doctors in the United Kingdom: the end or the beginning? - BMJ, 2000
 From CME to CPD: getting better at getting better? - BMJ, 2000
 The clinical skills resource: a review of current practice - Medical Education, 1999
 Immunohistochemistry of soft tissue tumours: a review - The Journal of Pathology, 1985
 An immunohistochemical study of Whipple's disease using the immunoperoxidase technique - Human Pathology, 1982

References 

Officers of the Order of the British Empire
Living people
British pathologists
Clair
Women pathologists
20th-century British women scientists
21st-century British women scientists
Alumni of the University of Southampton
Fellows of the Royal College of Pathologists
Year of birth missing (living people)